SPIE is the Society of Photo-Optical Instrumentation Engineers, an international optical engineering society.

SPIE may also refer to:
 SPIE SA, a French industrial equipment company
Special Patrol Insertion/Extraction, a military technique for insertion/extraction
Spie Batignolles, France-based multinational engineering company
SPIE Gold Medal, the highest honor of the International Society for Optics and Photonics
SPIE Newsroom, a technical news website launched in March 2006